The Book of Liang (Liáng Shū), was compiled under Yao Silian and completed in 635. Yao heavily relied on an original manuscript by his father Yao Cha, which has not independently survived, although Yao Cha's comments are quoted in several chapters.

The Book of Liang is part of the Twenty-Four Histories canon of Chinese history.

Sources
Although the Book of Liang was finally attributed to Yao Silian, a number of people worked on it. Initially, Emperor Wen of Sui ordered Yao Cha 姚察 (533–606) to compile the Book of Liang but Yao Cha died without being able to complete it. Before dying Yao Cha requested that his son Yao Silian complete the work. Emperor Yang of Sui agreed to compilation of the text by Yao Silian. In the Tang, the compilation of the text was part of an initiative at the suggestion of Linghu Defen shortly after the founding of the Tang dynasty to compile a number of histories for the previous dynasties. Then, Yao Silian was ordered to complete the Book of Chen by Emperor Gaozu of Tang, who ordered other scholars to work on the Book of Liang. When those scholars did not complete their task, Yao Silian was again ordered to work on the text. The Book of Liang was finally compiled by Yao Silian under the supervision of Fang Xuanling and Wei Zheng in the Tang, incorporating at least some of the work of his predecessors.

Quotations on Japan and its surrounding neighbours
It contains the history of the Liang dynasty, and various descriptions of countries to the east of China. One such passage is the description by the monk Hui Shen (慧深) of the country of Fusang, 20,000 li east of China.

Note, the Chinese measure of distance (li) used in the Book of Liang corresponds to 400 metres.

The State of Wa
Wa was an ancient kingdom of Japan. Though little concrete information can be found today, its capital precinct, Yamatai, was most likely located either in Kyūshū or in the Kinki region.

"As for Wa, they say of themselves that they are posterity of Tàibó. The people are all tattooed. Their territory is about 20,000 li (1,500 kilometres) from our realm, roughly to the east of Guiji (modern Shaoxing (Zhejiang)). It is impossibly distant. To get there from Daifang, it is necessary to follow the coast and go beyond the Korean state to the south-east for about 500 kilometres, then for the first time cross a sea to a small island 75 kilometres away, then cross the sea again for 75 kilometres to Miro country (Ch: 未盧國). 50 kilometers to the southeast is the country of Ito (Ch:伊都國). 10 kilometres to the southeast is the country of Nu (Ch:奴國). 10 kilometers to the east is the country of Bumi (Ch:不彌國). 20 days to the south by boat is the country of Touma (Ch:投馬國). 10 days to the south by boat or one month by land is the country of Yamatai (邪馬臺國). There resides the King of the Wa people."

The State of Wenshen 
 "The country of Wenshen is 7,000 li (500 kilometers) north-east of the country of Wa. Over their body, they have tattoos depicting wild beasts. They have three tattooed marks on their foreheads. The marks are straight for noble people, and they are small for lowly people. The people like music, but are not very generous in spite of their affluence, and do not give anything to strangers. They have houses, but no castles. The place in which their king resides is decorated with gold and silver in a manner of rare beauty. The buildings are surrounded by a ditch, about one cho in width, which they fill with quicksilver. When there is rain, it flows on top of the quicksilver. They have many rare things in their markets. Those who are guilty of a light offence are immediately punished with leather whips. Those who commit crimes punishable by death are made to be eaten by ferocious beasts; if there has been any error, then the ferocious beasts will avoid and not eat the victim. Crimes can also be redeemed through imprisonment without food."

The State of Dahan 
 "The people of Dahan are 5,000 li (400 kilometers) east of Wenshen. They do not have an army and are not aggressive. Their manners are the same as those of the country of Wenshen, but their language differs."

Contents

Annals (本紀)

Biographies (列傳)

See also
 Twenty-Four Histories
 Fusang
 Jinping Commandery

Notes

References

Citations

Sources

External links 

 Text of the Book of Liang, available from National Sun Yat-sen University.
Vol. 54 in Chinese and Japanese
Book of Liang 《梁書》 Chinese text with matching English vocabulary

Twenty-Four Histories
7th-century history books
Liang dynasty
History books about the Northern and Southern dynasties
Tang dynasty literature
7th-century Chinese books